Olobob Top is a British children's television series created by Leigh Hodgkinson and Steve Smith. The programme is narrated by Stephen Mangan.

Plot
The series follows a group of 3 animals called the Olobobs. Tib, Lalloo and Bobble live in a big forest and have fun playing, exploring and solving everyday problems. In each episode, with the help of Olobob Top,
they work together combining shapes, colours and patterns to create a new character, who joins in with the Olobobs’ fun, while a friendly narrator encourages them to think for themselves, who suggests in each episode that it “looks like a trip to the...Olobob Top!”.

Characters
Tib (voiced by Tom Aspinall) - The oldest brother, who is a rabbit
Lalloo (voiced by Elsa Hodgesmith) - The middle sister, who is a koala
Bobble (voiced by Sidney Hodgesmith) - The youngest brother, who is a hamster
Big Fish (voiced by India Newman) - A large pink-purple fish-like creature
Crunch (voiced by Veronica Painter) - A squirrel
Deeno (voiced by Ivar Davies-Seaton) - A green mole
Gurdy - A large snail
Grown Up (voiced by Barnaby Templer) - The local adult, only his lower legs and feet are seen
Leaves - 5 performing leaves
Lemon (voiced by Matilda Brookes) - A moose
Norbet (voiced by Finlay Pilfold) - A bear who is the local shopkeeper

Episodes

Series 1 (2017–18)

Series 2 (2019)

References

External links
Official site
Beakus's Olobob Top page
Cloth Cat Animation's Olobob Top page
Olobob Top on CBeebies
Olobob Top on ABC iView

2017 British television series debuts
2010s British animated television series
2010s British children's television series
British children's animated adventure television series
CBeebies
English-language television shows
British preschool education television series